Salamieh is a city and district in western Syria, in the Hama Governorate. The city is nicknamed the "mother of Cairo" because it was the birthplace of the second Fatimid caliph al-Qa'im bi-Amr Allah, whose dynasty would eventually establish the city of Cairo, and the early headquarters of his father Abdullah al-Mahdi Billah who founded the Fatimid Caliphate. The city is an important center of the Shi'ite Nizari Isma'ili and Taiyabi Isma'ili Islamic schools and also the birthplace of poet Muhammad al-Maghut. The population of the city is 66,724 (2004 census).

History
Salamieh is an ancient city occupied at least since 3500 BC, when it was part of ancient Babylonia. It was inhabited by Sumerians by around 3000 BC, Amorites by 2400 BC, Aramaeans by 1500 BC, and Nabateans by 500 BC. The city was destroyed for the first time by the Assyrian Empire in 720 BC. After being rebuilt, the city was part of the Roman Empire. It was ruled by the royal family of Emesa and functioned as a Roman client kingdom.

During the Byzantine period, Salamieh was known as a center of Christianity. The city boasted its own autocephalous archbishop until it was destroyed for a second time in 637 during the Byzantine-Sassanid Wars. The city was again rebuilt in the Islamic era by Abdallah ibn Salih ibn Ali al-Abassi, the Abbasid governor of southern and central Syria. Al-Abbasi's son Muhammad worked to transform Salamieh into an important commercial center. As part of these efforts he settled a number of Hashimites in the city in 754.

According to Isma'ili Muslims, their Imam, Isma'il ibn Jafar died and was buried in the city after going into hiding during the eighth century. The city became the secret headquarters of the Isma'ili movement from the early ninth century until 902, it was from there that missionaries were originally sent for propagating the Isma'ili teachings in different regions. It was from Salamieh, that the Isma'ili Imams secretly guided the activities of their followers from North Africa to Persia, Azerbaijan, and Central Asia. According to conflicting histories, the Isma'ili Imam, and first Fatimid Caliph, Abdallah al-Mahdi Billah was either born in Salamieh or came to the city in 882 from Khuzistan, in modern-day Iran where he was raised by his uncle Abul Shalaghlagh the Hujjah (also called Lahiq) or leader of the Isma'ilis of Salamieh, one of the twelve Isma'ili communities at the time. Abdullah's son Muhammad al-Qa'im bi-Amr Allah, an Isma'ili Imam and the second Fatimid Caliph, was born in Salamieh in the late ninth century, and both left the city to establish the Fatimid state in northern Africa in the early tenth century.

After the death of Abul Shalaghlagh in 899, a dispute arose between Salamieh Isma'ilis due to the fact that he left no male descendants and apparently had designated his nephew Abdullah as his spiritual successor and leader of the Salamieh Isma'ili movement. Thereafter, a schism split the movement, provoked by Abdullah's claims on the imamate for himself and his descendants. Hamdan Qarmat and 'Abdan, who may have previously drifted slightly away from the doctrine propagated by the leadership, broke off their support. Qarmat's followers would eventually be known as the Qarmatians, and after Abdullah fled from Salamieh to found the Fatimid Isma'ili state in North Africa in 899, the Qarmatis would reject the legitimacy of the Fatamids. In 903, Salamieh was destroyed for the third time by an invasion from the rebel Qarmatians under Yahya ibn Zikrawayh.

Salamieh is mentioned by historians as a very small town with limited rural settlement consequent to the Qarmatian invasion until the early Ottoman period. Under the Ottomans, the town served as the centre of a sancak (sub-province) of Tripoli. For most of the sixteenth to eighteenth century, the city was held by a member of the Abu Rish bedouin dynasty serving as Ottoman governors. It was expanded when permission by the Ottoman Sultan Abdul Hamid II through a firman in July 1849 gave permission for the emigration of Isma'ilis led by Isma'il bin Muhammad, the Isma'ili amir of Qadmus in northern Syria. Isma'ilis from Qadmus and Masyaf among other smaller towns and villages emigrated to the newly rebuilt city which was first occupied by only sixteen families and by 1861, Salamieh became an agricultural village. The final major Isma'ili immigration to Salamieh occurred in 1919.

Salamieh is currently the largest population center of Isma'ili Muslims in the Arab world. The remains of Prince Aly Khan, the father of the current Nizari Isma'ili Imam Aga Khan IV, are buried in the city. The headquarters of the Isma'ili Shia Higher Council of Syria are in the city, as are dozens of Jama'at Khana. During the mid-twentieth century, Salamieh saw a growth of religious diversity with the building of the first Sunni mosque, and now the city is home to almost a dozen Sunni mosques and a Ja'fari Shia mosque in the city's Qadmusite Quarter which is home to most of the city's Ithna Ashari Shia which migrated to the city after ethnic and religious clashes in their hometown of Qadmus in the early twentieth century. Currently, a little more than half of the city's residents are Isma'ili.

In 1934, Muhammad al-Maghut, the poet credit for being the father of free verse Arab poetry, was born in Salamieh.
In 1991, visitors from the Dawoodi Bohra sect of Isma'ili Shia Islam in Yemen built the Mosque of Imam Isma'il adjacent to the grave of the Isma'ili Imam Isma'il. The mosque was built by order of their leader the Da'i al-Mutlaq Mohammed Burhanuddin according to an inscription on the mosque's wall. Although currently used for worship by Sunni Muslims, the mosque and mausoleum are visited in religious pilgrimages by Dawoodi Bohra worldwide.

From 2012 to 2017, with the development of frontlines in Syrian Civil War, the city grew in its strategic importance. With Al-Rastan becoming a pocket outside government control along the Homs-Hama Motorway, and the developments in Idlib governorate resulting in the government also losing control of large segments of the main Hama-Aleppo Highway, the Homs-Salamieh, Hama-Salamieh, and Salamieh-Ithriya-Aleppo roads became major lines connecting these government-held areas. This importance was why the town was the target of occasional ISIL or rebel mortar attacks. Also, some of the town's citizens have participated in protests during the Civil War. The importance of Salamieh diminished following the Syrian Army's securing of the Homs-Hama Motorway on February 1, 2018, during the  Northwestern Syria campaign.

Residence history of Salamieh 
The residence history of Salamieh is as follows:
"The Ismaili dais in search of a new residence for their Imam came to Salamia and inspected the town and approached the owner, Muhammad bin Abdullah bin Saleh, who had transformed the town into a flourishing commercial centre. They told him that there was a Hashimite merchant from Basra who was desirous of settling in the town. He readily accepted and pointed out to them a site along the main street in the market, where existed a house belonging to a certain Abu Farha. The Ismaili dais bought it for their Imam and informed him about it. Wafi Ahmad arrived to his new residence as an ordinary merchant. He soon pulled down the old building and had new ones built in its place; and also built a new wall around it. Money and treasures were carried on camels to the door of that tunnel at night. The door opened and the camels entered with their loads inside the house."The photo placed here shows the mausoleum of the Imam. Near his kabra mubarak ("blessed grave"), the tunnel opening still exists.

Culture
The city is an agricultural center, with a largely agriculture based economy. Mate is extremely popular in Salamieh and a drink of major cultural importance in social gatherings.

Main sights
 A hammam of unique architecture, likely dating from the Ayyubid era, sits in the town center, near a large underground Byzantine cistern which is said to lead all the way to Shmemis castle. There also exists one wall from an ancient Byzantine citadel.
 The castle, of Roman-Greek origins.
 Walls, rebuilt by Zengi
 Mosque of al-Imam Isma'il, which originated as an Ancient Greek temple of Zeus, and was turned into a church in Byzantine times.
 Remains of Roman canals, used for agriculture

Climate
Salamieh has a cold semi-arid climate (Köppen climate classification BSk).

References

Bibliography

 
   p.  158

External links
 Google Satellite Image
 Ministry of Tourism
 https://web.archive.org/web/20070818010209/http://salamieh.reefnet.gov.sy/
 http://www.salamieh.com

Cities in Syria
Emesene dynasty
Ismaili communities in Syria